Blotto may refer to:

 Blotto (biology), a reagent used in immunological assays
 Blotto, a colloquial term meaning drunkenness
 Blotto (film) a 1930 Laurel and Hardy short comedy film
 Blotto (band), an Albany, NY, rock band in the late 1970s and early 1980s
 Blotto games, a class of zero-sum games named after a fictional Colonel Blotto